Verkhnyokamianske is a village (selo) in Ukraine, in Bakhmut Raion, Donetsk Oblast. It has a population of 960.

Geography 

The , a tributary of the Bakhmutka river, flows through the village.

History 
During the Holodomor, 18 residents of the village died.

Russo-Ukrainian War (2014 – present)

In 2014, during the opening stages of the Russo-Ukrainian War, Verkhnyokamianske was seized by forces of the separatist, pro-Russian Donetsk People's Republic, led by Russian army veteran and former FSB officer Igor Girkin. On July 24, the village was announced to have been recaptured by Ukrainian security forces.

During the 2022 Russian invasion of Ukraine, Verkhnokamianske saw fighting again. On 7 August 2022, the General Staff of the Ukrainian Armed Forces claimed that Russian forces conducted assaults to try to improve its position near Verkhnyokamianske, but "was unsuccessful and retreated." On 5 February 2023, Ukrainian forces reportedly repelled Russian assaults on the village.

Demographics 

In 2001, it had 960 inhabitants, of whom 918 spoke Ukrainian and 42 spoke Russian.

Culture 

The Ukrainian Greek Catholic Church operates a Church of the Nativity of the Most Holy Theotokos in the village.

References 

Villages in Bakhmut Raion